The Crow: Salvation is a 2000 American superhero film directed by Bharat Nalluri. Starring Eric Mabius as Alex Corvis and the third installment of The Crow film series, based on the comic book character of the same name by James O'Barr. After its distributor cancelled the intended wide theatrical release due to The Crow: City of Angels''' negative critical reception, The Crow: Salvation was released direct-to-video after a limited theatrical run.

Plot

In Salt Lake City, Alexander "Alex" Frederick Corvis is framed for the murder of his girlfriend, Lauren Randall and sentenced to death. Three years later he is executed in the electric chair suffering a painful death due to lighting overriding the energy of the chair.

The Crow that was mysteriously resurrected after the events of City of Angels, resurrects Alex and gives him supernatural abilities that would allow him to avenge Lauren´s death. Alex follows the crow and finds evidences that Lauren was killed by a group of corrupt cops, including one that has a scar on his arm that match the one he saw just before his execution. Later he encounters Erin, Lauren´s sister, who believes that he is guilty, but he tells her that he will prove his innocence.

Later Alex finds a witness in the trial who was bribed to give perjured testimony and forces him to confess that five members of the police forces, Detective Madden, Martin Toomey, Vincent Erlich, Stan Roberts and Phillip Dutton killed Lauren.

Alex begin his road to vengeance killing Dutton while saving two young girls from being raped by him, then he provokes Erlich to die in a car crash, but he drops the list of the cops he is after, being found by Roberts and Toomey. With evidences found in Erlich´s car, Alex and Erin find out that, Nathan Randall, Erin and Lauren's father, is in business with the corrupt cops and is indirectly responsible for her death when Lauren uncovered the truth. Erin runs in horror from Nathan when he is confronted with the truth.

Erin confesses to Alex that she felts guilty for Lauren´s murder because she told the cops where they can find Lauren, thinking that they would only arrest Alex. With his powers, Alex shows that Lauren fought off her attackers and how Erin should forgive herself. When she comes back home she finds her father killed himself out of remorse. Later, Alex finds out from his lawyer, Peter Walsh, that one of Nathan's businesses was revealed as a front for a drug smuggling operation and Lauren had witnessed Roberts killing a man in the Key Club, leading to her death.

Book and Madden kill walsh and kidnap Erin. Alex starts a shootout at the Key Club in which he impales Roberts with a pipe he breaks off the ceiling, and kills the remaining police. Madden shows up and tries to kill Alex, but his shot accidentally shoots a broken gas pipe; the explosion kills Toomey. Alex walks out of the fire and sees an arm hanging out of the rubble with the scar on it and The Crow leaves him after he feels he "fulfilled his duty".

From a clue left by Walsh, Alex deduces that the  'king' was still alive. He heads to the police station to kill Book, but, without his powers he is stabbed by Book and dies from his wounds. In his agony, Alex begins to believe he caused Lauren´s death accepting his demise. Book brings Alex's body to a room where Erin is tied with her mouth stitched shut and the body of Walsh is shown hanged and missing an arm. Erin manages to drop Lauren´s locket and the Crow drops it next to Alex, being a promise of love and truth. It revives Alex, allowing him to set Erin Free and kill both Madden and the secretary while Book runs after Erin. Alex catches up with them and exposes Book´s arm, showing the actual scar Alex saw during his execution.

Alex and Erin take Book to the electric chair and execute him to the point to cremating him in the chair. Alex´s soul is finally released to reunite with Lauren and Erin keeps Lauren´s necklace with her.

Cast

Production
Initial development on a third Crow film was announced in August 1997, when it was announced Rob Zombie would be making his directorial debut with The Crow: 2037. White Zombie covered the KC and the Sunshine Band hit "I'm Your Boogie Man" for the soundtrack of The Crow: City of Angels, and after seeing Rob Zombie's work on the video he produced for the song, Edward Pressman offered Zombie the opportunity to helm the third Crow film. Had the film been made, Zombie planned to shift focus in tone from the revenge angle of the previous two entries, to a more horror based approach. The film would've began in 2010, when a young boy and his mother are murdered on Halloween night by a Satanic priest. A year later, the boy is resurrected as the Crow. Twenty-seven years later, and unaware of his past, he has become a bounty hunter on a collision course with his now all-powerful killer.

In September 1998, it was announced Bharat Nalluri would serve as director of the third film in The Crow series with the script being provided by Chip Johannessen. In October 1998, it was announced Kirsten Dunst had joined the cast. In November 1998, it was announced  Eric Mabius was in negotiations to star as the lead in the film. Dimension had intended to release the film theatrically for a Halloween 1999 release.

Release
Reception

The review aggregator website Rotten Tomatoes reported an 18% approval rating based on 11 reviews, being only 2 positive.

Lisa Nesselson of Variety responded positively to the film, opining that it was "a reasonably suspenseful, adequately made programmer" with a "calmly and wryly effective" protagonist and "efficient f/x artillery." JoBlo's Berge Garabedian awarded The Crow: Salvation a score of 4/10, and concluded, "The film itself was definitely a little more entertaining than the second installment with some pretty slick gory death scenes, a loud but cool soundtrack, and a lead who doesn't throw you off with a cheesy accent. In fact, I credit Mabius for pulling off a decent outing despite my initial skepticism (A teen Crow? Never!). Unfortunately, you don't really care about ANY of the characters, especially the bad guys or the family left behind, so all you're basically left with is a low-rent Crow retread with a decent lead, a nice look, but plenty of bad dialogue, zero originality or depth." David Nusair of Reel Film Reviews had a similarly middling response to the film, giving it a score of 2/5, criticizing its casting and anemic violence, and writing, "While Salvation certainly isn't as bad as that first sequel, it still doesn't come near the sheer coolness of the first one."

Nathan Rabin of The A.V. Club lambasted the film as "a repugnant exercise in emptily stylish ultraviolence that plays like the longest, most expensive Rammstein video ever made" and closed his review of it with, "Dour and humorless even as its over-the-top violence and awful dialogue propel it to the realm of high camp, The Crow: Salvation marks a nadir for a series that was never especially good to begin with." Jonathan Barkan of Bloody Disgusting counted The Crow: Salvation and The Crow: Wicked Prayer as being among the worst horror films that he had ever seen, calling them "deplorable" before going on to say, "Both of them felt like lazy, slapdash, thoughtless, cash cows and that feeling permeates in every scene, oozing out of the celluloid like some damn viscous disease." Nick Perkins of Coming Soon was similarly derisive of the film, ranking it as the worst in the series, and writing, "In theory, it's a good story. It should be, as it was written by Crow creator, James O'Barr. It's just the execution that left a lot to be desired. Mabius absolutely lacked the charisma that Brandon Lee possessed in spades. And though Kirsten Dunst also starred in this film, the supporting characters were generally as bland as the lead."

Home media
On September 9, 2014, Lionsgate re-released the film on DVD. On October 7, 2014, it was released on DVD by Lionsgate in a triple feature edition with the other Crow sequels, The Crow: City of Angels and The Crow: Wicked Prayer''.

References

External links

2000 films
2000 action thriller films
2000s crime action films
2000s mystery films
2000s police films
2000s romantic action films
2000s superhero films
2000s vigilante films
American action thriller films
American crime action films
American films about revenge
American mystery films
American police films
American sequel films
American superhero films
American supernatural romance films
American vigilante films
The Crow films
Miramax films
Dimension Films films
Films about father–daughter relationships
Films about capital punishment
Films about dysfunctional families
Films about grieving
Films about kidnapping in the United States
Films about lawyers
Films about mass murder
Films about miscarriage of justice
Films about organized crime in the United States
Films about orphans
Films about police corruption
Films about prison escapes
Films about prostitution in the United States
Films about rape
Films about single parent families
Films about sisters
Films about striptease
Films about the illegal drug trade
Films about telepathy
Films about undead
Films directed by Bharat Nalluri
Films scored by Marco Beltrami
Films set in 1997
Films set in 2000
Films set in prison
Films set in Utah
Films shot in Salt Lake City
Gothic fiction
Resurrection in film
Supernatural action films
2000s English-language films
2000s American films